San Giorgio al Palazzo is a baroque-style, Roman Catholic church in central Milan, region of Lombardy, Italy.

History
The church was founded around 750 by archbishop Natalis, and was modernized in Baroque style by Francesco Maria Richini in 1623. The façade, designed by Francesco Croce, was built in the 18th century.

The most striking feature of the interior is the Passion Chapel, with panels and frescoes painted by Bernardino Luini in 1516. In the first chapel on the right is a canvas by Gaudenzio Ferrari.

Notes

See also

 Saint George: Devotions, traditions and prayers

Giorgio al Palazzo
Roman Catholic churches completed in 1623
8th-century churches in Italy
17th-century Roman Catholic church buildings in Italy
Baroque architecture in Milan
1623 establishments in Italy
Tourist attractions in Milan